Dariyabad is a constituency of the Uttar Pradesh Legislative Assembly covering the town of Dariyabad in the Barabanki district of Uttar Pradesh, India. Dariyabad is one of five assembly constituencies in the Faizabad Lok Sabha constituency. Since 2008, this assembly constituency is numbered 270 amongst 403 constituencies.

Members of the Legislative Assembly

Election results

2022 

 

Samajwadi Party candidate "Arvind Singh Gop" received 35.03% (95,817) votes, 8.13 from 2017

2017

In 2017, Bharatiya Janta Party candidate Satish Chandra Sharma won the 2017 Uttar Pradesh Legislative Elections defeating Samajwadi Party candidate, Agriculture minister and 6 times MLA Rajiv Kumar Singh by a margin of 50,686 votes.

See also
Dariyabad (disambiguation)

Notes

External links
 

Assembly constituencies of Uttar Pradesh
Barabanki district